Cananore Football Club was an Australian rules football club founded in 1901. It competed in the Tasmanian Football League (TFL/TANFL) as a junior club from 1901 to 1907, and as a senior club between 1908 and 1941. They were known as the Canaries and wore black and gold as their club colours.

In 1942, the TFL competition was suspended indefinitely due to World War II. The club did not resume competition after the war and, to all intents and purposes, the former Cananore Football Club was transformed into what is now the Hobart Football Club.

History

Cananore played as a junior club between 1901 and 1907; and, as a junior club, played their matches at West Hobart Oval (the current school oval of the Lansdowne Crescent School) .

Cananore gained senior club status for the 1908 TFL season; and, from then, played their home games at the Tasmanian Cricket Association Ground.

The name of the Cananore Football Club was derived from a misspelt plaque on a large family home, which had been a gathering point for fans of the club in its formative years. The house is long demolished and the plaque is now displayed in the Hobart Football Clubrooms.

The club were TFL/TANFL premiers eleven times and Tasmanian State Premiers on ten occasions.

The Canaries' final season of football was the 1941 TANFL Season under coach J.Cashmore. The club would go into recess due to World War Two, and, in 1944, TANFL executives drew up a plan to turn the competition into a regulated, district-based format upon resumption of the League in 1945, rather than the previous motley collection of clubs.

As a result of these changes, Cananore was replaced in the TANFL by the Hobart Football Club who would go on to share the same black and gold colours, same home ground (TCA Ground) and many of the same players and supporters from Cananore would go on to be involved with Hobart for many years to come.

Tasmanian Football Hall of Fame
On 18 May 2010, AFL Tasmania announced that the Cananore Football Club and Hobart Football Club would be inducted together in the Great Clubs category of the Tasmanian Football Hall of Fame.

Notable footballers
Two Cananore footballers to have been inducted in the Australian Football Hall of Fame are Albert Collier, who was also known for his long career at Victorian Football League club , and Horrie Gorringe, who played his entire career at Cananore. Cananore footballers to have played in the VFL include Claude Bryan, Jack Cashman, Jack Gardiner, Pat Hartnett, Fred Pringle, Alan Scott, Ted Terry, and Graham Tudor. Fred Easton joined  in 1911.

Honours

Club
 Tasmanian Football League (11): 1909, 1910, 1911, 1913, 1921, 1922, 1925, 1926, 1927, 1931, 1933
 Tasmanian State Premiership (10): 1909, 1910, 1911, 1913, 1921, 1922, 1925, 1926, 1927, 1931

Individual

William Leitch Medallists
 1930 - Jack Billett.
 1931 - Albert Collier.

George Watt Medallists
 1940 - Geoff Kilmartin.

TFL Leading Goalkickers
 1909 - F.Burton (11)
 1910 - C.Ward (16)
 1911 - C.Ward (24)
 1913 - G.Badenach (13)
 1924 - J.Brain (47)
 1925 - J.Brain (64)
 1926 - F.Ahearne (50)
 1927 - F.Ahearne (45)

References

Australian rules football clubs in Tasmania
1901 establishments in Australia
1941 disestablishments in Australia
Australian rules football clubs established in 1901
Australian rules football clubs disestablished in 1941
Sport in Hobart
Tasmanian Football League clubs